4-Iodopropofol is a drug derived from the commonly used sedative anaesthetic agent, propofol. 4-Iodopropofol has similar effects to propofol on isolated receptors, acting primarily as a GABAA positive modulator and sodium channel blocker, but when given to animals it has only anxiolytic and anticonvulsant effects, lacking the strong sedative-hypnotic profile of propofol.

References 

Anticonvulsants
Anxiolytics
Phenols
Iodoarenes